The Chess Federation of Canada or CFC (French name: Fédération canadienne des échecs) is Canada's national chess organization. Canadian Chess Association, founded in 1872, was replaced in 1932 by the Canadian Chess Federation (CCF), which for the first time included representation from all major cities in Canada. In 1945 the name was changed to avoid confusion with the Co-operative Commonwealth Federation. The CFC organizes tournaments and publishes national ratings. The highest rated player in Canada is Evgeny Bareev of Toronto.

Activities 
From 1974 to 2008 the CFC published a bi-monthly magazine called Chess Canada. Its former titles were En Passant and CFC Bulletin.  The magazine reported on the latest important tournaments in Canada, especially those with Grandmaster-strength players, including many game scores.  The magazine also printed the top ratings of several age groups and top overall in Canada. Chess Canada also posted notices of upcoming tournaments across Canada.  It has since been replaced with an online magazine, which contains many of the same functions. The editor is John Upper.

The CFC organizes the Canadian Open every July. The first Canadian Open was held in Montreal in 1956 and saw the participation of Bobby Fischer. In recent years, the tournament has increased in prestige, becoming a part of the ACP Tour in 2007. Previous editions attracted Boris Spassky, Paul Keres, Bent Larsen, Ljubomir Ljubojević, Alexei Shirov, Vasily Ivanchuk and Nigel Short. The Canadian Youth Chess Championships are usually held just prior to the Canadian Open at the same location.

The CFC organizes a national championship every one or two years. As Canada is a FIDE Zone, many players earn their International Master or FIDE Master title in the Canadian Chess Championship. In addition, the CFC runs the Canadian Women's and Canadian Junior Championship. It also sends men's and women's teams to Chess Olympiads held every other year.

Ratings system
The CFC uses the ELO rating system. CFC ratings for a player tend to be around fifty points higher than United States Chess Federation ratings and ninety points higher than FIDE ratings.

CFC Titles

The CFC awards chess titles to players who perform at a high level. Besides the minimum ratings shown below there are several other conditions that must be met involving norms and other factors.
 National Master (2200)
 National Candidate Master (2000)
List of CFC titled players

Current Champions
as of 2022
Canadian Champion: Evgeny Bareev 
Women's Champion: Maili-Jade Ouellet 
Junior Champion U18: Shawn Rodrigue-Lemieux

See also
 Canadian chess periodicals
 Manitoba Chess Association

References

External links
 

Canada
Chess in Canada
Sports governing bodies in Canada
1872 establishments in Canada
Sports organizations established in 1872
Chess organizations
1872 in chess
1932 in chess